Apollonieis was a deme of ancient Attica, of the phyle of Attalis, sending five delegates to the Athenian Boule. It was established in 200 BCE and named after Apollonis, wife of Attalus I.

Its site is unlocated.

References

Populated places in ancient Attica
Former populated places in Greece
Demoi
Lost ancient cities and towns
200s BC establishments